is a Japanese pole vaulter.

His personal best is 5.83 metres, which is the current Japanese National Record (as of 2019/01/01) achieved in May 2005 in Shizuoka. Sawano is a three-time Olympian (2004, 2008, 2016), two-time Olympic Finalist, whose best finish was 7th at the Rio Olympics (2016).

Sawano is currently coached by the staff at the University of Japan (Nichidai) and USA Track and Field National Pole Vault Chair, Brian Yokoyama.  He was formerly coached by former Japanese record holder Teruyasu Yonekura and renown Japanese pole coach Yamazaki.

Competition record

References

External links
 
 
 
 

1980 births
Living people
Sportspeople from Osaka
Japanese male pole vaulters
Olympic male pole vaulters
Olympic athletes of Japan
Athletes (track and field) at the 2004 Summer Olympics
Athletes (track and field) at the 2008 Summer Olympics
Athletes (track and field) at the 2016 Summer Olympics
Asian Games gold medalists for Japan
Asian Games silver medalists for Japan
Asian Games gold medalists in athletics (track and field)
Asian Games medalists in athletics (track and field)
Athletes (track and field) at the 2006 Asian Games
Athletes (track and field) at the 2014 Asian Games
Medalists at the 2006 Asian Games
Medalists at the 2014 Asian Games
World Athletics Championships athletes for Japan
Asian Athletics Championships winners
Japan Championships in Athletics winners
Fujitsu people